Jagdal Union Parishad is a union council under Derai Upazila of Sunamganj District in the division of Sylhet, Bangladesh.

Geography
Jagdal Union is located in the north-east corner of Derai Upazila. It is bordered with Dakshin Sunamganj Upazila in the north, Jagannathpur Upazila to the east, Kulanj Union on the south, and Karimpur Union to the west.

Notable people
 Baul Shafiqun Noor, Baul musician

See also
 Derai Municipality
 Derai Upazila

References

Unions of Derai Upazila